In mathematics, Muirhead's inequality, named after Robert Franklin Muirhead, also known as the "bunching" method, generalizes the inequality of arithmetic and geometric means.

Preliminary definitions

a-mean

For any real vector

define the "a-mean" [a] of positive real numbers x1, ..., xn by

where the sum extends over all permutations σ of { 1, ..., n }.

When the elements of a are nonnegative integers,  the a-mean can be equivalently defined via the monomial symmetric polynomial  as

where ℓ is the number of distinct elements in a, and k1, ..., kℓ are their multiplicities.

Notice that the a-mean as defined above only has the usual properties of a mean (e.g., if the mean of equal numbers is equal to them) if . In the general case, one can consider instead , which is called a Muirhead mean.

 Examples
 For a = (1, 0, ..., 0), the a-mean is just the ordinary arithmetic mean of x1, ..., xn.
 For a = (1/n, ..., 1/n), the a-mean is the geometric mean of x1, ..., xn. 
 For a = (x, 1 − x), the a-mean is the Heinz mean.
 The Muirhead mean for a = (−1, 0, ..., 0) is the harmonic mean.

Doubly stochastic matrices

An n × n matrix P is doubly stochastic precisely if both P and its transpose PT are stochastic matrices.  A stochastic matrix is a square matrix of nonnegative real entries in which the sum of the entries in each column is 1.  Thus, a doubly stochastic matrix is a square matrix of nonnegative real entries in which the sum of the entries in each row and the sum of the entries in each column is 1.

Statement 

Muirhead's inequality states that [a] ≤ [b] for all x such that xi > 0 for every i ∈ { 1, ..., n } if and only if there is some doubly stochastic matrix P for which a = Pb.

Furthermore, in that case we have [a] = [b] if and only if a = b or all xi are equal.

The latter condition can be expressed in several equivalent ways; one of them is given below.

The proof makes use of the fact that every doubly stochastic matrix is a weighted average of permutation matrices (Birkhoff-von Neumann theorem).

Another equivalent condition
Because of the symmetry of the sum, no generality is lost by sorting the exponents into decreasing order:

Then the existence of a doubly stochastic matrix P such that a = Pb is equivalent to the following system of inequalities:

(The last one is an equality; the others are weak inequalities.)

The sequence  is said to majorize the sequence .

Symmetric sum notation
It is convenient to use a special notation for the sums. A success in reducing an inequality in this form means that the only condition for testing it is to verify whether one exponent sequence majorizes the other one.

This notation requires developing every permutation, developing an expression made of n! monomials, for instance:

Examples

Arithmetic-geometric mean inequality 

Let

and

We have

Then
 [aA] ≥ [aG],
which is

yielding the inequality.

Other examples 
We seek to prove that x2 + y2 ≥ 2xy by using bunching (Muirhead's inequality).
We transform it in the symmetric-sum notation:

The sequence (2, 0) majorizes the sequence (1, 1), thus the inequality holds by bunching.  

Similarly, we can prove the inequality

by writing it using the symmetric-sum notation as

which is the same as

Since the sequence (3, 0, 0) majorizes the sequence (1, 1, 1), the inequality holds by bunching.

See also 
 Inequality of arithmetic and geometric means
 Doubly stochastic matrix
 Monomial symmetric polynomial

Notes

References
Combinatorial Theory by John N. Guidi, based on lectures given by Gian-Carlo Rota in 1998, MIT Copy Technology Center, 2002.
 Kiran Kedlaya, A < B (A less than B), a guide to solving inequalities
 
  Hardy, G.H.; Littlewood, J.E.; Pólya, G. (1952), Inequalities, Cambridge Mathematical Library (2. ed.), Cambridge: Cambridge University Press, Section 2.18, Theorem 45.

Inequalities
Means